Geroa Bai is a regional political coalition in the Chartered Community of Navarre, created for the 2011 election to the Cortes Generales. It includes the Basque Nationalist Party (EAJ-PNV), Atarrabia Taldea, and the Zabaltzen partnership. These groups had shared the former coalition Nafarroa Bai, along with Eusko Alkartasuna and Aralar (which entered the coalition Amaiur), and Batzarre.

History
Geroa Bai elected one representative to the Congress of Deputies in the general elections held in 2011 (Uxue Barkos, who had been the representative of Nafarroa Bai in her previous term). Geroa Bai holds 9 seats in the much fragmented Parliament of Navarre since 2015. Since July 2015, Uxue Barkos (Geroa Bai) presides the regional government of Navarre relying also on EH Bildu, Podemos and Izquierda-Ezkerra.

Composition

Electoral performance

Parliament of Navarre

Cortes Generales

Nationwide

Regional breakdown

European Parliament

Notes

References

 
2011 establishments in Spain
Political parties established in 2011
Political parties in Navarre
Political party alliances in Spain
Separatism in Spain